Gilbert Howard McIntyre (February 17, 1852 – December 1, 1913) was a Canadian politician.

Born in St. Mary's, Canada West, the son of George Maclntyre and Margaret Howard, McIntyre was educated at St. Mary's
Grammar School and the Ontario College of Pharmacy in Toronto. A pharmacist, he was also a private banker and an exporter of Canadian produce. He has been member of the Municipal Council and Mayor of St. Mary's. He was first elected to the House of Commons of Canada at the general elections of 1904 for the electoral district of Perth South. A Liberal, he was re-elected in 1908 and was defeated in 1911. From 1909 to 1911, he was the Deputy Speaker and Chairman of Committees of the Whole of the House of Commons.

References
 
 The Canadian Parliament; biographical sketches and photo-engravures of the senators and members of the House of Commons of Canada. Being the tenth Parliament, elected November 3, 1904

1852 births
1913 deaths
Liberal Party of Canada MPs
Mayors of places in Ontario
Members of the House of Commons of Canada from Ontario
People from St. Mary's, Ontario
Canadian pharmacists